Saphenista cuscana is a species of moth of the family Tortricidae. It is found in Peru.

The wingspan is about 21 mm. The ground colour of the forewings is creamish, in the basal half of the wing is suffused with pale brown and with some glossy parts and brownish dots. The dorsum is suffused brownish. The hindwings are creamish, but darker and spotted grey on the periphery.

References

Moths described in 2010
Saphenista